Cosmopterix sapporensis is a moth in the  family Cosmopterigidae. It is found in Japan and Russia.

The wingspan is 12–14 mm.

References

Natural History Museum Lepidoptera generic names catalog

sapporensis